Meri Aan  is a 1993 Bollywood film directed and produced by Roopesh Kumar. It stars Ayub Khan, Prithvi, Farheen, Sabeeha in lead roles. Sanjay Dutt made a cameo appearance.

Cast

Ayub Khan as Salim
Prithvi as Nadir 
Farheen as Farheen
Sabeeha as Rukhsar
Mukesh Khanna as Police Commissioner Ashfaque Khan
Anjana Mumtaz as Mrs. Ashfaque Khan
Shahbaz Khan as Sher Khan
Deepak Shirke as Kaalia Patil
Shashi Puri as Advocate Mahesh Agarwal
Subbiraj as Ashfaque's Father-in-law
Paidi Jairaj as Rukhsar's Father
Chandrashekhar as Nadir's Father 
Kunika as Nagina Bai
Roopesh Kumar as Qawwali Host
Sanjay Dutt as Guest Appearance

Music
Ravindra Jain wrote all the lyrics.

References

External links
 
 Meri Aan at AllMovie

1993 films
1990s Hindi-language films
Films scored by Ravindra Jain